Alatyr (Ulatăr) is a town in the Chuvash Republic, Russia, located on the Sura River at its confluence with the Alatyr River. Population:  43,161 (2002 Census);  43,000 (1968).

History
Alatyr is one of the oldest towns in the republic. It was founded in 1552 as a fortified outpost where an old Mordvin village once stood, and was granted town status in 1780. Alatyr gained economic importance in 1894 after to the construction of the Moscow—Ryazan—Kazan railroad.

Administrative and municipal status
Within the framework of administrative divisions, Alatyr serves as the administrative center of Alatyrsky District, even though it is not a part of it. As an administrative division, it is incorporated separately as the town of republic significance of Alatyr—an administrative unit with the status equal to that of the districts. As a municipal division, the town of republic significance of Alatyr is incorporated as Alatyr Urban Okrug.

Demographics

Russians: 87.3%
Mordvins: 7.2%
Chuvash: 4.1%
Others: 1.4%

Gallery

References

Notes

Sources

External links
Official website of Alatyr 
Directory of organizations in Alatyr 

Cities and towns in Chuvashia
Populated places established in 1552
1552 establishments in Russia
Alatyrsky Uyezd